The Skole Beskids is a mountain range in western Ukraine, belonging to the set of ranges called the Eastern Beskids, within the Outer Eastern Carpathians.

The mountains are composed primary of Carpathian flysch.  The northern section of the range is the location of the Skole Beskids National Nature Park, established in 1999; within the park is the highest peak in the range, Mount Parashka, at 1268 meters. Zwinin Mountain, at 992 meters above sea level, is also located within the park.

The Skole Beskids is also the site of the sandstone fortresses of Tustan', built between the 9th century and 13th century, now a State Historical and Cultural Reserve.  It's near the town of Boryslav.

See also

References

Sources

Gallery

External links 

 Національний природний парк «Сколівські Бескиди» 
 Encyclopedia of Ukraine: Beskyds
 Carpathian Mountains: Division (map)

Mountain ranges of Ukraine
Mountain ranges of the Eastern Carpathians
Protected areas of the Eastern Carpathians
Beskids